The Juniata River is a tributary of the Susquehanna River, approximately  long, in central Pennsylvania. The river is considered scenic along much of its route, having a broad and shallow course passing through several mountain ridges and steeply lined water gaps. It formed an early 18th-century frontier region in Pennsylvania and was the site of French-allied Native American attacks against English colonial settlements during the French and Indian War. 

Approximately two-thirds of the watershed is forested. It is the second largest tributary of the Susquehanna after the West Branch Susquehanna.

Description
The Juniata River forms in western Huntingdon County at the confluence of the Frankstown Branch and the Little Juniata River, between the boroughs of Alexandria and Petersburg. The river flows southeast through Huntingdon and continues to the small village of Ardenheim, where the Raystown Branch, the longest of the Juniata's tributaries, enters from the southwest. The Juniata continues southeast, through a gap in the Jacks Mountain ridge. On the southeast side of the ridge it receives Aughwick Creek from the south, then flows northeast, along the eastern flank of the Jacks Mountain ridge to Lewistown, where it collects Kishacoquillas Creek and Jacks Creek. From Lewistown it flows southeast, in a winding course, receiving Tuscarora Creek from the south at the Port Royal river bridge and passing through a gap in the Tuscarora Mountain ridge. The Juniata River is joined by three creeks in Millerstown in northeast Perry County. The Juniata River joins the Susquehanna River in Reed Township, Dauphin County immediately northwest of the Clarks Ferry Bridge.

Along the river’s banks there are many access areas maintained by the Pennsylvania Fish and Boat Commission, as well as informal access areas and campground river access. The Juniata River is a popular spot for swimming, fishing, and boating. It even used to be the host of the Juniata River Sojourn, which was held annually from 2001 (when the river was named Pennsylvania River of the Year) through 2015.

Etymology
The word "Juniata" is thought to be a corruption of the Iroquoian word Onayutta, meaning "Standing Stone". There was a large standing stone where the town of Huntingdon now stands. It disappeared in 1754, when the tribe left; tradition says they took it with them. A second stone was raised by the new settlers but destroyed in 1897. A two-foot (0.6 m) fragment of the second stone sits in Juniata College's museum.

History

The first known inhabitants of the river valley were the Onojutta-Haga Indians. The valley was later inhabited by the Lenape until a treaty negotiated by William Penn opened the land to east of the Allegheny Ridge to white settlement. In 1755–1756, as a result of Lenape anger over loss of their lands, the white settlement in the valley suffered fierce raids and abductions from Lenape and Shawnee at Kittanning on the Allegheny River. Over 3,000 white settlers were killed in the raids. The burning of Fort Granville at present-day Lewistown in 1756 prompted Pennsylvania governor John Penn to launch a reprisal against the Lenape and Shawnee led by Lt. Col. John Armstrong, who burned Kittanning in September 1756.

During the 19th century, the river was paralleled by the Juniata Division Canal, part of the canal system of Pennsylvania and a rival to the Erie Canal. The state sold the canal to the Pennsylvania Railroad, which abandoned the canal in 1889 after severe flooding. Parts of the original locks from the canal, as well as remnants of a dam approximately 1 mile (2 km) south of Millerstown, are still visible today.

The river is a popular destination for recreational canoeing and fly fishing, in particular for smallmouth bass and channel catfish suited to the river's gentle course.  The muskellunge was introduced as predatory sport fish and is now a prized catch. Attempts are underway by the state to reintroduce the once-prevalent American shad, which went into decline largely because of dams on the river.  Walleye is another game fish prevalent in the Juniata River.

The National Book Award and Pulitzer prize-winning poet Galway Kinnell wrote of the river in a section of The Book of Nightmares (1971), entitled "Dear Stranger, Extant in Memory by the Blue Juniata" ("The Blue Juniata" was a well-known 19th-century parlor song).

The river cuts through several southwest-to-northeast ridges, largely of sandstone between limestone valley floors. Several of the river's tributaries, including Kishacoquillas Creek, are degraded by pollution, but the main stem of the river is considered fairly clean by regional standards.  The only city in the watershed with ten thousand or more residents is Altoona. Steep slopes along much of the river's course have largely discouraged widespread development.

Gallery

See also
List of rivers of Pennsylvania
Bloody Run Canoe Classic
Heirline Covered Bridge

References

Bibliography 

Kaylor, Earl C. 1996. Martin Grove Brumbaugh: A Pennsylvanian's Odyssey from Sainted Schoolman to Bedeviled World War I Governor, 1862–1930. Fairleigh Dickinson University Press.
McIlnay, Dennis P. 2003. Juniata, river of sorrows: One Man's Journey Into a River's Tragic Past. Seven Oaks Press.

External links
U.S. Geological Survey: PA stream gaging stations
Juniata Clean Water Partnership
 

Rivers of Pennsylvania
Tributaries of the Susquehanna River
Rivers of Huntingdon County, Pennsylvania
Rivers of Juniata County, Pennsylvania
Rivers of Mifflin County, Pennsylvania
Rivers of Perry County, Pennsylvania
Rivers of Dauphin County, Pennsylvania